Andrew Willcox is an Australian politician and former mayor who is a member of the House of Representatives since 2022, representing the division of Dawson. He is a member of the Liberal National Party and sits with the National Party in federal parliament.

Biography
Willcox was born and grew up in Bowen, Queensland, as a third-generation tomato farmer.

Willcox elected on to the Whitsunday Regional Council as a Division 6 councillor in 2012. He was subsequently elected as the mayor of the Whitsunday Regional Council in 2016, and was re-elected to the same position in April 2020.

In August 2021, Willcox was selected as a Liberal National Party candidate for the division of Dawson. In April 2022, he took leave from his mayoralty role to contest the 2022 federal election. He was elected at the federal election on 21 May and subsequently resigned as Mayor officially in June.

References

Members of the Australian House of Representatives for Dawson
Liberal National Party of Queensland politicians
Living people
Year of birth missing (living people)
Australian farmers
National Party of Australia members of the Parliament of Australia
Liberal National Party of Queensland members of the Parliament of Australia